FK962 is a compound which acts as an enhancer of somatostatin release. It stimulates nerve growth and neurite elongation, and has been researched in animal models for potential applications in the treatment of conditions such as Alzheimer's disease and retinal neuropathy.

See also 
 Octreotide
 Pasireotide
 Sunifiram (structural similarity)

References 

Pharmacology
Chemical substances